The tenth The Desert Sessions LP, titled Volume 10: I Heart Disco, was released in 2003, packaged along with Volume 9: I See You Hearin' Me in a gatefold 10" album format. "In My Head...Or Something" later appeared on the Queens of the Stone Age album Lullabies to Paralyze under the title "In My Head".

Track listing

Ipecac Recordings albums
2003 albums
10